Porcher Island is an island in Hecate Strait, British Columbia, Canada, near the mouth of the Skeena River and southwest of the port city of Prince Rupert.  The locality of Porcher Island is located near the island's northern tip at Humpback Bay, .  Stephens and Prescott Islands are located off its northwestern tip.

Geography 
The island’s northern tip is 
 southwest of the port city of Prince Rupert, and 
 due south of the southernmost extension of the Alaska Panhandle. The island is located within the Range 5 Coast Land District and the Skeena-Queen Charlotte Regional District. Porcher Island is bounded on the north by Chatham Sound and the Skeena River estuary, by Hecate Strait to the west and by Ogden Channel to the east. Metlakata Inlet and Kitkatla Channel separate Porcher’s southern flank from the Goschen, Dolphin and Spicer Islands, near the entrance to Principe Channel.

Porcher Island is nearly bisected from the south by Porcher Inlet, a long, narrow channel that intrudes  into the island’s interior, before emptying into a salt lagoon at the foot of the Spiller Range. Oval Bay, on the island’s western edge, features a  sandy beach, which is exposed to the ferocious southeast gales that regularly sweep through Hecate Strait.

The interior of the island is hilly, Egeria Mountain, southeast of Porcher Inlet, is the tallest reaching to 2,915 feet, while the Bell Range dominates to the northwest.

History 
Porcher Island, part of the territories of the Gitxaala Nation, is named after Edwin Augustus Porcher, RN (1821–1878), who served as Commander of HMS Sparrowhawk at Esquimalt Naval Base, Vancouver Island, from the spring of 1865 until he returned to England in the fall of 1868. While serving with the North Pacific Squadron, Commander Porcher made four summertime voyages to the North Coast of British Columbia; in 1866, 1867 and twice in 1868. The route of the Inside Passage that the Sparrowhawk took from Esquimalt to the Hudson’s Bay Company trading post at Fort Simpson (the Tsimshian village of Lax Kw'alaams) would have passed close by the island in Chatham Sound that now bears the Commander’s name.

With the exception of a brief influx of homesteaders in the wake of Prince Rupert being chosen as the terminus of the Grand Trunk Pacific Railway in 1906, Porcher Island has always been sparsely populated. The island’s relative isolation, combined with wet, cool summers and severe winters, has discouraged many of those who sought to make Porcher Island their permanent home. Nonetheless, three small settlements that were established during the 20th century still boast a few inhabitants today. These settlements are to be found at Hunts Inlet (formerly Jap Inlet) and at Humpback Bay, both on the island’s northernmost tip, and at Oona River, which flows into Ogden Channel at the island’s eastern edge.

Hunts Inlet is a collection of older buildings grouped around a government dock, with the more recent addition of a number of vacation homes built by Prince Rupert residents.

Humpback Bay is the site of the former Porcher Island Cannery, now derelict. The salmon cannery was originally built by the Chatham Sound Fishing and Packing Company in 1928, but operated for only four years before closing at the end of the 1932 salmon season. The site was later purchased by the Canadian Fishing Company and used as a summer gillnet station until 1968, when gillnet operations were transferred to North Pacific Cannery. Humpback Bay continued to serve as a net storage facility until the 1980s, when the Crown lease was sold to private interests.

With 30 or so permanent residents, Oona River currently has the largest population of the three surviving Porcher Island settlements. Situated at the northern end of Ogden Channel, Oona River was originally settled by Scandinavian immigrants in the years before and after the First World War. The village has long been a source of wooden boats for the B.C. salmon fishing industry. Scores of these sturdy, seaworthy vessels were hand-built from red and yellow cedar by early settlers and their descendants, and some can still be seen in use today. The Oona River Salmon Enhancement Project, first established some 25 years ago, continues to rebuild threatened coho salmon stocks in the Porcher Island area.

The island, together with some of its surrounding area, (excluding Kitkatla (Laxklan), a Tsimshian village, is situated on Dolphin Island) had a population of 37 in the Canada 2006 Census, down 26% from the 2001 census.

Ecology 
Porcher Island is part of the Hecate Lowland Ecosection, a once heavily glaciated band of narrow lowland rain forest and coastal archipelago that stretches from Portland Inlet in the north to Queen Charlotte Strait in the south. Hecate Lowland terrain is generally rough and rocky, with wide areas of muskeg wetland and bog forest. Tree species include western red cedar, yellow cedar, mountain hemlock and fir. Salal, ferns, and skunk cabbage are commonly found undergrowth. Lowland climate in the Porcher Island region is dominated by frontal flows from Dixon Entrance, resulting in frequent wind storms and heavy rainfall. 

Waterfowl are found in abundance throughout the protected inlets and estuaries that notch Porcher Island’s 100 mile coastline. Species include Merganser, Surfbird, Marbled Murrelet, Glaucous-winged gull, Northwest heron, Red-Throated Loon, Rhinoceros auklet, Greater white-fronted goose and Northern bald eagle. Both Chatham Sound and Kitkatla Channel afford a profusion of breeding and nesting habitat for a wide variety of seabirds, and are essential components of the Pacific coast migratory flyway.

External links
 A history of Porcher Island Cannery

References 

Blyth, Gladys Young. Salmon Canneries, North Pacific Coast, Oolichan Books, Lantzville, B.C., 1991.
British Columbia Magazine, Volume 45, Number 2, Summer 2003, pp. 11–19.
Smith, Dwight L. (ed) A Tour of Duty of the Pacific Northwest: E. A. Porcher and H.M.S. Sparrowhawk, 1865–1868, University of Alaska Press, Fairbanks, Alaska, 2000

Islands of British Columbia
North Coast Regional District
North Coast of British Columbia
Unincorporated settlements in British Columbia
Range 5 Coast Land District